Two-striped mabuya may refer to either of two small skink species formerly placed in the genus Mabuya:

 Eutropis multicarinata from Asia, otherwise known as Many-keeled Mabuya
 Varzea bistriata from the Americas

Animal common name disambiguation pages